The Ossewabrandwag (OB) (from  and  - Ox-wagon Sentinel) was an anti-British and pro-German South African organisation in South Africa during World War II, which opposed South African participation in the war. Afrikaners formed the Ossewabrandwag in Bloemfontein on 4 February 1939.

Background

Following the British takeover of what had previously been the Dutch Cape Colony during the Napoleonic Era, most of the Boers of the northeastern Cape frontier migrated to the interior; these migrants eventually established the Orange Free State and South African Republic. In 1881, the independence of these frontier states was confirmed following their victory over the British Empire in the brief Anglo-Boer War. Following the discovery of large gold and mineral deposits in Boer territory, war broke out again in 1899. By 1902, Great Britain conquered both the Boer Republics, overcoming stubborn Boer resistance through the use of a scorched earth policy and concentration camps implemented by Lord Kitchener. 

During the conflict, the Boer cause enjoyed a degree of support from the Netherlands and to a lesser extent the German Empire. 

After the war, a degree of reconciliation developed between the Afrikaners and British, facilitating the formation of the Union of South Africa in 1910, under the leadership of former Boer Commandos such as Louis Botha and Jan Smuts. South African Union Defence Force troops, including thousands of Afrikaners, served in the British forces during World War I.

Nonetheless, many Boers remembered the tactics used by Britain in the Second Boer War and remained resentful of British rule, even in the looser form of Dominion status.

1930s
The chief vehicle of Afrikaner nationalism at this time was the "Purified National Party" of D. F. Malan, which broke away from the National Party when the latter merged with Smuts' South African Party in 1934. Another important element was the Afrikaner Broederbond, a quasi-secret society founded in 1918, and dedicated to the proposition that "the Afrikaner volk has been planted in this country by the Hand of God..."

1938 was the centennial anniversary of the Great Trek (the migration of Boers to the interior). The Ossewabrandwag was established in commemoration of the Trek. Most of the migrants travelled in ox-drawn wagons, hence the group's name. The group's leader was Johannes Van Rensburg, a lawyer who had served as Secretary of Justice under Smuts (as Minister), and was a supporter of Germany at the time.

During World War II

The Boer militants of the Ossebrandwag (OB) were hostile to the United Kingdom and sympathetic to Nazi Germany. Thus the OB opposed South African participation in the war, even after the Union declared war in support of Britain in September 1939. While there were parallels, neither Van Rensburg nor the OB were genuine fascists, according to van den Berghe.

 however shows that OB was "based on the Führer-principle, fighting against the Empire, the capitalists, the communists, the Jews, the party and the system of parliamentarism... on the base of national-socialism" according to a German secret source dated 18 January 1944.

Members of the OB refused to enlist in the UDF and sometimes harassed servicemen in uniform. This erupted into open rioting in Johannesburg on 1 February 1941; 140 soldiers were seriously hurt.

More dangerous was the formation of the Stormjaers (Assault troops), a paramilitary wing of the OB. The nature of the Stormjaers was evidenced by the oath sworn by new recruits: "If I retreat, shoot me. If I fall, avenge me. If I charge, follow me".

The Stormjaers engaged in sabotage against the Union government. They dynamited electrical power lines and railroads and cut telegraph and telephone lines. These types of acts were going too far for most Afrikaners, and Malan ordered the National Party to break with the OB in 1942.

The Union government cracked down on the OB and the Stormjaers, placing thousands of them in internment camps for the duration of the war. Even so many of the internees, including future prime minister B. J. Vorster, became future leaders of the ruling National Party during apartheid. Moreover, the internment aroused Afrikaner opposition to the government and helped the NP win the 1948 general election. 

At the end of the war, the OB was absorbed into the National Party and ceased to exist as a separate body.

See also
Robey Leibbrandt

References 

1939 establishments in South Africa
1952 disestablishments in South Africa
Defunct civic and political organisations in South Africa
Political history of South Africa
Military history of South Africa during World War II
Fascism in South Africa
Nazi parties
South Africa–United Kingdom relations
Organizations established in 1939
Organizations disestablished in 1952
Afrikaner nationalism